Local Route 20 Pohang–Yeongdeok Line is a local route of South Korea that connecting Pohang to Yeongdeok County, North Gyeongsang Province.

History
In 1994, the route was planned as a part of an extension of National Route 20 from Gyeongju to Pohang, but due to a lack of funding, this never happened and instead was designated as a local route on 25 August 2001.

Stopovers
 North Gyeongsang Province
 Pohang (Nam District, Buk District) - Yeongdeok County

Major intersections 

 (■): Motorway
IS: Intersection, IC: Interchange

North Gyeongsang Province

See also 
 Roads and expressways in South Korea
 Transportation in South Korea

References

External links 
 MOLIT South Korean Government Transport Department

20
Roads in North Gyeongsang